Pleasant Hill, also known as Rivenoak and Hawkins House, is a historic plantation house located near Middleburg, Vance County, North Carolina.  It was built in 1759 and remodeled in the 1850s in the Greek Revival style.  It is a -story, five bay, Georgian double pile plan frame dwelling.  It has a moderately steep gable roof with dormers and double-shoulder brick chimneys.  The original dwelling was probably built by Philemon Hawkins, Jr., and birthplace of Governor William Hawkins (1777-1819).

It was listed on the National Register of Historic Places in 1979.

References

Plantation houses in North Carolina
Houses on the National Register of Historic Places in North Carolina
Georgian architecture in North Carolina
Greek Revival houses in North Carolina
Houses completed in 1855
Houses in Vance County, North Carolina
National Register of Historic Places in Vance County, North Carolina